A Suspended Ordeal is a 1914 short comedy film directed by and starring Fatty Arbuckle.

Cast
 Roscoe 'Fatty' Arbuckle
 Minta Durfee

See also
 List of American films of 1914
 Fatty Arbuckle filmography

External links

1914 films
Films directed by Roscoe Arbuckle
1914 comedy films
1914 short films
American silent short films
American black-and-white films
Silent American comedy films
American comedy short films
1910s American films